Sedlarevo is a village in the municipality of Želino, North Macedonia.

Demographics
As of the 2021 census, Sedlarevo had 419 residents with the following ethnic composition:
Albanians 379
Persons for whom data are taken from administrative sources 40

According to the 2002 census, the village had a total of 1,611 inhabitants. Ethnic groups in the village include:
Albanians 1,605
Bosniaks 2
Others 4

References

External links

Villages in Želino Municipality
Albanian communities in North Macedonia